The 1981 SMU Mustangs football team represented Southern Methodist University (SMU) as a member of the Southwest Conference (SWC) during the 1981 NCAA Division I-A football season. Led by Ron Meyer in his sixth and final season as head coach, the Mustangs compiled an overall record 10–1 with a mark of 7–1 in conference play, winning the SWC title. 

The Mustangs had been put on probation by the NCAA for recruiting violations and were banned from participating in any bowl game in 1981. Since SMU's performance would have given them an automatic berth in the Cotton Bowl Classic, the team decided to treat its final regular season game at Arkansas as their bowl game and nicknamed it the "Polyester Bowl". SMU defeated the Razorbacks 32-18.

SMU finished at No. 5 in the final AP Poll. Because its rules prevent schools under probation from being considered, the Mustangs were not ranked in the Coaches Poll at all during the season. At season's end, the Mustangs were recognized as one of five co-national champions by the National Championship Foundation (NCF). 

The team's offense scored 365 points while the defense allowed 137 points.

Schedule

Roster

Rankings

Game summaries

Arkansas

Source: Eugene Register-Guard
    
    
    
    
    
    
    
    
    
    

SMU wins first conference title since 1966 (ineligible for Cotton Bowl Classic berth).

Team players drafted into the NFL

References

SMU
SMU Mustangs football seasons
Southwest Conference football champion seasons
SMU Mustangs football